The Los Angeles Times is the largest newspaper in Los Angeles.

Los Angeles Times may also refer to:

Los Angeles Times Magazine (also shortened to LA), a monthly supplement magazine of the Los Angeles Times newspaper
Los Angeles Times Building, part of Times Mirror Square

See also
Los Angeles Times Syndicate, a print syndication service that operated from c, 1949 to 2000
Los Angeles Times 500, an annual NASCAR Winston Cup race held at Ontario Motor Speedway during the 1970s
Los Angeles Times Grand Prix, a sports car race held at the Riverside International Raceway from 1957 until 1987
Los Angeles Times Book Prize, a set of annual book prizes by the newspaper 
Los Angeles Times Festival of Books, founded in 1996
Los Angeles Times v. Free Republic, a United States district court copyright law case 
Los Angeles Times–Washington Post News Service, a joint news agency between the Los Angeles Times and The Washington Post from 1962 to 2009